Sumur Batu is an administrative village in the Kemayoran district of Indonesia. It has a postal code of 10640.

See also
 List of administrative villages of Jakarta

External link
 Population_of_Indonesia_by_Village (archive.org)

Administrative villages in Jakarta